The 1978 Montana Grizzlies football team was an American football team that represented the University of Montana in the Big Sky Conference during the 1978 NCAA Division I-AA football season. In their third year under head coach Gene Carlson, the team compiled a 5–6 record.

Schedule

References

Montana
Montana Grizzlies football seasons
Montana Grizzlies football